Turnditch is a village and civil parish in the Amber Valley district of Derbyshire, England. The population of the civil parish at the 2011 Census was 301.

It is built on both sides of the road halfway up the steep climb out of the Ecclesbourne Valley. Nearer to the brow of the hill is a place known as Cross o' th' Hands.

In Norman times it was within Duffield Frith and part of the manor of Duffield. The Church of All Saints was built in the 13th century as a chapel of ease to Duffield, while a Congregational chapel with a Sunday school was erected in 1818.

See also
Listed buildings in Turnditch

References

External links

Villages in Derbyshire
Towns and villages of the Peak District
Civil parishes in Derbyshire
Geography of Amber Valley